Nadège Labbey (born 28 February 1979) is a French international rugby union player. playing as a prop. She has 28 caps with the France national women's rugby team, 

She is the president of the Ovalie Caennaise club.

Career 
Nadège Labbey started rugby union late in 2002. She played in a club with Ovalie Caennaise, and had 28 selections for the France team. 

She competed at the 2009 Women's Six Nations Championship, and the 2010 Women's Rugby World Cup.

She then became president of her club Ovalie caennaise,  from 2011 to 2016.

References 

1979 births
French rugby union players
Living people
French female rugby union players